The Heard Museum is a private, not-for-profit museum in Phoenix, Arizona, United States, dedicated to the advancement of American Indian art. It presents the stories of American Indian people from a first-person perspective, as well as exhibitions of traditional and contemporary art by American Indian artists and artists influenced by American Indian art. The Heard Museum collaborates with American Indian artists and tribal communities on providing visitors with a distinctive perspective about the art of Native people, especially those from the Southwest.

The Heard Museum's mission is to be "the world's preeminent museum for the presentation, interpretation and advancement of American Indian art, emphasizing its intersection with broader artistic and cultural themes." The main Phoenix location of the Heard Museum has been designated as a Phoenix Point of Pride.

The museum operated the Heard Museum West branch in Surprise which closed in 2009. The museum also operated the Heard Museum North Scottsdale branch in Scottsdale, Arizona, which closed in May 2014.

History
The Heard Museum was founded in 1929 by Dwight B. and Maie Bartlett Heard to house their personal collection of art. Much of the archaeological material in the Heards' collection came from La Ciudad Indian ruin, which the Heards purchased in 1926 at 19th and Polk streets in Phoenix.

Portions of the museum were designed by architect Bennie Gonzales, who also designed Scottsdale City Hall.

From its start as a small museum in a small southwestern town, the Heard has grown in size and stature to where now it is recognized internationally for the quality of its collections, its educational programming and its festivals. The current collection of the Heard Museum consists of over 40,000 items including a library and archives with over 34,000 volumes.  The museum has over 130,000 square feet (12,000 m²) of gallery, classroom, and performance space. Some exhibits include:
 Home: Native Peoples in the Southwest
 The Mareen Allen Nichols Collection containing 260 pieces of contemporary jewelry
 The Barry Goldwater Collection of 437 historic Hopi kachina dolls
 An exhibition on the 19th century boarding school experiences of Native Americans.  According to the New York Times, the exhibit admirably "captures the little-known experience of thousands of children bused, sometimes forcibly, from their reservations to government schools in order to erase their culture and ’civilize’ them. Haunting photographs, old uniforms, oral interviews and memorabilia offer a powerful look at this chapter in history."
The Heard Museum now attracts about 250,000 visitors a year. The Heard is an affiliate in the Smithsonian Affiliations program. The director of the museum from January 2010 through July 2012 was Dr. Letitia Chambers, the first Heard director to be of American Indian descent. From August 5, 2013 to February 27, 2015, the museum was led by James Pepper Henry, a member of the Kaw Nation of Oklahoma and the Muscogee Creek Nation. The museum is now led by David M. Roche, who began his tenure January, 2016.

The museum is a member of the North American Reciprocal Museums program.

Festivals
The Heard hosts the annual El Mercado de Las Artes, usually in November, with strolling mariachis and artwork by Hispanic artists from Arizona and New Mexico including santos, pottery, colcha embroidery, furniture making, painting, printmaking and silver and tinwork. The Heard also hosts the annual World Championship Hoop Dance Contest, typically held in early February. The Hoop Dance Contest is held in the outdoor Libby Amphitheater in front of the museum. 

The Annual Heard Museum Guild Indian Fair and Market, a juried art fair and festival, has been held yearly since 1958. The Indian Fair and Market is held annually in March draws in 15,000 visitors and features over 600 Native American artists, and includes a juried competition for the best artwork of the fair appropriately called "Best of Show." Approved artists compete in eight classifications: Jewelry and Lapidary Work; Pottery; Paintings, Drawings, Graphics, Photography; Wooden Carvings; Sculpture; Textiles/Weavings/Clothing; Diverse Art Forms; Baskets.

The judges of this competition come from a diverse range of occupations including experienced artists, museum curators, gallery directors, and art collectors. All have in-depth experience in judging artwork, and the majority of these judges come from American Indian tribes. Awards and cash prizes are given for Best of Show, Best of Division (first and second place), and an additional Conrad House award. The judges also confer a Judge's Choice ribbon and an Honorable Mention ribbon.

See also

List of historic properties in Phoenix, Arizona

References

External links
 
 

Landmarks in Arizona
Phoenix Points of Pride
Smithsonian Institution affiliates
Institutions accredited by the American Alliance of Museums
Museums in Phoenix, Arizona
Art museums established in 1929
Native American museums in Arizona
Art museums and galleries in Arizona
1929 establishments in Arizona